Nové Město may refer to places in the Czech Republic:

Nové Město (Hradec Králové District), a municipality and village in the Hradec Králové Region
Nové Město na Moravě, a town in the Vysočina Region
Nové Město nad Metují, a town in the Hradec Králové Region
Nové Město pod Smrkem, a town in the Liberec Region
New Town, Prague (Czech: Nové Město), a district of Prague

See also
 Nové Mesto (disambiguation)
 Novo Mesto